The following is a list of Pacific typhoon seasons. The seasons are limited to the north of the equator between the 100th meridian east and the 180th meridian (aka Prime Antimeridian).

Seasons

Pre-1940

1940s

1950s

1960s

1970s

1980s

1990s

2000s

2010s

2020s

See also

Parent topics
 Tropical cyclone
 List of environment topics
 List of tropical cyclones
 Lists of tropical cyclone names

Other tropical cyclone basins
Atlantic hurricane season
Pacific hurricane season
North Indian Ocean tropical cyclone season
South-West Indian Ocean tropical cyclone season
Australian region tropical cyclone season
South Pacific tropical cyclone season
South Atlantic tropical cyclone
Mediterranean tropical-like cyclone

References

 
Pacific typhoon seasons
Pacific typhoon seasons